The Towers can refer to:

United Kingdom
 The Towers (Manchester), a 20th-century research facility
 The Towers (Sheffield), a small country house in Sheffield

United States
 The Towers (Atlantic Highlands, New Jersey), on the National Register of Historic Places (NRHP)
 The Towers (Narragansett, Rhode Island), on the NRHP
 The Towers (Newport News, Virginia), a public housing project
 The Towers (Ohio State), twin towers used a dormitories on the main campus of Ohio State University

Canada
 The Towers (Canada), a mountain on the Continental Divide and on the border of British Columbia and Alberta in the Canadian Rockies

See also
 The Tower (disambiguation)
 Tower (disambiguation) (includes "Towers")